Jonathan Peter Kasdan (born September 30, 1979) is an American film and television screenwriter, director, producer and actor.

Biography
Kasdan was born to a Jewish family, the son of Meg (née Goldman), a writer, and film director Lawrence Kasdan. He is the brother of director and actor Jake Kasdan.  His directorial debut, In the Land of Women, was released in the United States in 2007.  Kasdan also wrote the film, which premiered at the Cannes Film Festival in 2006.  Kasdan has worked as a writer for the American television series Freaks and Geeks, and as an actor in Dawson's Creek and Dreamcatcher.  He had his acting debut in 1983 in his father's film, The Big Chill.  Kasdan was diagnosed with Hodgkin's disease when he was a 17-year-old junior in high school.

Filmography

Filmmaking credits

Acting credits

References

External links

Adam Brody seduces Chicago on "In the Land of Women", MidwestBusiness.com, 4/17/07

1979 births
Living people
American male actors
American film directors
American male screenwriters
American television writers
Jewish American screenwriters
American male television writers
21st-century American Jews